The Chevrolet Series AD Universal  or Chevrolet Universal AD is a Chevrolet car which began sales in 1930. Available in a variety of body types including as a 2-door coupe, 4-door sedan and a delivery van. Total production was down due to the Wall Street Crash of 1929 while 864,243 were manufactured and 39,773 came from Oshawa. The seven-millionth Chevrolet since 1912 was built May 28, 1930 at Flint Assembly

History

The Series AD was launched as replacement for the 1929 Series AC models. Sales dropped by over 200,000 to 640,980 vehicles for the year. 

The suspension now included hydraulic shock absorbers and the fuel gauge was moved from the tank to the dash panel, along with an angled, non-glare windshield and new instrument gauges with circular shapes and black faces, smaller 19" wheels using wire spokes while hickory spoke wheels were now optional. The previous Imperial Sedan was replaced with the Special Sedan, which separated the name and image from top level Cadillac, while the process of dedicating one body style to Chevrolet factories continued. In 1930, Chevrolet bought the Martin-Parry Body Company who supplied chassis and passenger compartment trucks with a factory-installed bed. In May of 1925 the Chevrolet Export Boxing plant at Bloomfield, New Jersey was repurposed from a previous owner where Knock-down kits for Chevrolet, Oakland, Oldsmobile, Buick and Cadillac passenger cars, and both Chevrolet and G. M. C. truck parts are crated and shipped by railroad to the docks at Weehawken, New Jersey for overseas GM assembly factories.

See also
1930 Cadillac Series 341
1930 LaSalle Series 303
1930 Oldsmobile F-Series
1930 Buick Series 50
1930 Oakland

References

Series AD Universal
Vehicles introduced in 1930
1930s cars
Rear-wheel-drive vehicles